Bríet Kristý Gunnarsdóttir (born 6 August 1988) is an Icelandic professional racing cyclist. She rode in the women's road race event at the 2020 UCI Road World Championships.

References

External links
 

1988 births
Living people
Icelandic female cyclists
Place of birth missing (living people)
20th-century Icelandic women
21st-century Icelandic women